Famiano Michelini (1604 – 1665) was an Italian mathematician, mainly interested in hydraulics.

Life 
Born in Rome in 1604, Famiano Michelini studied in Genoa among the Order of Poor Clerics Regular of the Mother of God of the Pious Schools, his math teacher was Antonio Santini. In 1629 he went in Florence to found the first piarists school. Galileo Galilei gave him a covering letter. 
He was in correspondence for many years with Galileo and other scientists. He taught mathematics in Pisa from 1635 to 1655, after Vincenzo Renieri; in 1635 Michelini also taught astronomy to Leopoldo de' Medici. 
He was then vicar of the Bishop of Patti, Sicily and he became the mathematician of Cardinal Leopoldo de' Medici, who financed his research.

Famiano Michelini was the first scientist to hypothesize a theory on active defense against corrosion of the river banks through the use of sprockets and he was never invited to the Cimento Academy. He died in Florence in 1665.

Works

References 

1604 births
1665 deaths
17th-century Italian mathematicians